The 1947–48 Iowa Hawkeyes men's basketball team represented the University of Iowa in intercollegiate basketball during the 1947–48 season. The team was led by sixth-year head coach Pops Harrison and played their home games at the Iowa Field House. The Hawkeyes finished the season with a 15–4 record (8–4 in Big Ten) and in second place in the Big Ten standings.

Roster

Schedule/results

|-
!colspan=9 style=|Non-conference

|-
!colspan=9 style=|Big Nine Conference

Honors and awards
Murray Wier – Chicago Tribune Silver Basketball, Consensus First-team All-American, NCAA scoring leader

BAA draft

References

Iowa Hawkeyes men's basketball seasons
Iowa
Iowa Hawkeyes Men's Basketball Team
Iowa Hawkeyes Men's Basketball Team